MXR Severn Estuary was a regional commercial digital radio multiplex in the United Kingdom, which served the West of England and South Wales, including Bristol, Bath, Weston-super-Mare, Cardiff, Newport, Swansea, the South Wales Valleys and north Somerset. The multiplex closed on 29 July 2013 after the shareholders Global Radio & Arqiva decided not to renew the licence.

Transmitters
MXR Severn Estuary was transmitted on frequency block 12C (227.360 MHz) from the following transmitter sites:

Services

The following channels were available on the multiplex at the time of closure:

BBC Radio Cymru and BBC Radio Wales were not required to be broadcast on this platform.

See also

MXR North East
MXR North West
MXR Yorkshire
MXR West Midlands

References

Digital audio broadcasting multiplexes